The Global Journal of Emerging Market Economies is a refereed academic journal that aims to provide basic reference material for policy-makers, business executives and researchers interested in issues relating to the economic prospects and performance of emerging market economies.

The journal covers the following broad areas: Global Financial Crisis and the Impact on Emerging Market Economies, Economic Development and inclusive growth, Climate Change and Energy, Infrastructure Development and Public Private Partnerships, Capital Flows to and from Emerging Market Economies, Regional Cooperation, Trade and Investment and Development of National and Regional Financial Markets. The Journal is published in association with the Emerging Markets Forum, in Washington DC and publishes selected papers from their annual global meetings.

The journal is a member of the Committee on Publication Ethics (COPE).

Abstracting and indexing 
Global Journal of Emerging Market Economies is abstracted and indexed in:
 EBSCO: EconLit
 Research Papers in Economics (RePEc)
 DeepDyve
 Portico
 Dutch-KB
 OCLC
 ProQuest: Political Affairs Information Service
 J-Gate

References

External links 

SAGE Publishing academic journals
Publications established in 2009
Economics journals
Development studies journals
English-language journals
Triannual journals